Ufuchiku Kobudo (大筑古武術) sometimes referred to as Ufuchiku Kobujutsu or Ufuchiku-Den is a form of Okinawan kobudō whose main weapon is the Sai, other weapons such as Bo, Eiku, tunfa (or tonfa), nunchaku, Tekko, Techu, Tenbi Rochin, and kama (weapon) are studied as secondary weapons.

History
Ufuchiku Kobudo was founded by an Okinawan named, Kanagushiku Sanda (1841–1926) or in Japanese, Kinjo Sanda. He was a police commissioner (Ufuchiku) by trade, hence the name of the style. Although his actual teachers are unknown, he did hint to have studied some under Ishimine Peichin, although not confirmed. He also acquired much of his weapons knowledge on the streets of Okinawa dealing with criminals. He served as the bodyguard to the last Okinawan king, Sho Tai.  This is a rare system and rarely taught even in Okinawa.

Lineage
The art was passed down to Shosei Kina (1882–1981) who was the second generation Soke or head master. Kina began his training under Ufuchiku Kanagusuku in 1906, wherein he was initiated into thirty-five types of kobujutsu–kata. Shosei Kina taught several prominent Okinawan martial artists such as, Shinyei Kyan, Masanobu Kina, Kaishu Isa and Kiichi Nakamoto. Kina was a member of the Okinawa Kobudo Kyokai and Okinawa Karate Kobudo Rengokai from which he was awarded the 10th Dan Rank. Kina founded the Ryukyu Dento Kobujutsu Budo Kyokai and served as its first president.

Today both Kaishu Isa and Kiichi Nakamoto claim the title of Soke for the system. Given the split in the lineage it may be correct to refer to the branches as Nakamoto-ha and Isa-ha.

Ryukyu Dento Kobujutsu Hozon Budo Kyokai
Upon the passing of Shosei Kina,  Shinyei Kyan succeeded him as 2nd President and 3rd Head Master. Upon the passing of Kyan, he appointed Kiichi Nakamoto as his successor, making him 3rd President and 4th Soke. Having been a direct student of Shosei Kina, Kiichi Nakamoto received a Menkyo-Kaiden and 9th Dan from Kina and He later received his 10th Dan from Shinyei Kyan. Nakamoto runs the association out of his dojo the Okinawakan, which is headquartered in Okinawa City, Okinawa. Nakamoto has multiple branch dojo in several countries, his senior kobudo students are Hideyuki Nakamoto, Masanori Zaha, Roy J. Hobbs, Jaime Pereira, Kazuhiro Hokama, C. Michial Jones and Takuma Higashi

Ufuchiku-den Ryūkyū Kobujutsu Hozonkai
The Ufuchiku-den Ryūkyū Kobujutsu Hozonkai was founded by Shosei Kina in 1975 and Isa Kaishu succeeded him as 2nd President and 3rd Soke Isa is a Buddhist priest by profession and spends a great deal of time with his official duties, however he does teach out of his dojo called the Shōrin-ryū Karate Kobudō Shūdōkan located in Futema, Okinawa. Isa has a small student following and the only foreign students are Walt Young and Anthony Marquez.

Rengeikan Dojo
The Kina family dojo was named Rengeikan, the main instructor at the dojo was Masanobu Kina (1929–1975), the nephew to Shosei Kina. Masanobu Kina trained solely under his uncle in both Shorin-ryu karate and Ufuchiku Kobujutsu. Masanobu Kina had several foreign students such as Robert Teller, Ron Nix and Anthony Marquez.

References

Okinawan kobudo